is a Japanese manga written by Masaya Hokazono and illustrated by Court Betten. The manga is serialised in Shueisha's  Weekly Young Jump. The manga is licensed for a French-language in France by Delcourt. The series contains a collection of short stories about romantic relationships of high school girls.

Manga
Shueisha published the manga's 5 bound volumes between June 18, 2004, and June 19, 2007. Delcourt published the manga's 5 bound volumes between March 13, 2008, and February 11, 2009.

Volume list

Reception
BD Gest' claims that the series can be summarized in three words: "School, sex, and socks". They comment that the relationships portrayed are flawed relationships because of their adolescent bases and their alternations between fantasy and reality, as well as an excessive focus on having love based purely on sex. They also felt that the series has potential, but also has great room for disappointment. MangaNews commends manga artist Court Betten saying that his work is "indeed sumptuous". The review also commends Masaya Hokazono's ability "to tell in a few pages, the randomness/hazard of the first love relationships". Animeland commends the manga for "every possible relationship combinations between young adults" without pudeur. Later reviews from Manganews criticises the stories as clichéd but commends the stories for "keep their funny side without overdoing it".

References

External links

Romance anime and manga
Seinen manga
Shueisha manga